WP Suspension GmbH is a manufacturer of components for motorcycle suspension systems based in Austria. The company was founded in 1977 as White Power Suspension B.V. in Malden, Netherlands, by Wim Peters, and is amongst the largest manufacturers of suspension components for motorcycles. It is today a wholly owned subsidiary of KTM AG.

Company history 
Dutch motocross rider Wim Peters had a serious crash in a race in 1975, needing over a year for recovery from injuries. The trained mechanical engineer used this downtime to improve the suspension elements of his motocross machine. Though the parts were originally intended only for his own use, Peters' success with his components was noticed by other racers, and he founded the company in 1977 to deal with demand.

A visual characteristic of the brand are the white coil springs on the coilover suspension struts, which also led to the original brand name, White Power. The white coating of the springs was originally due to the chosen supplier being a hospital bed manufacturer, and white was the only colour they had available. Racing success at the end of the 1970s and into the 1980s established the brand's reputation.

In the 1980s, the company developed from an aftermarket producer to an original equipment manufacturer for KTM in 1983, and later for Husaberg and BMW Motorrad.

In 1983, WP was the first manufacturer to introduce an upside-down fork (USD) into mass production. The USD fork has since become the standard equipment in on-road and off-road performance motorcycles.

In 1984, WP supplied suspension components to KTM's first Motocross World Championship victory in the 250cc class with Heinz Kinigadner.

After bankruptcy in 1991 and the subsequent refounding, the brand name WP Suspension replaced the name White Power.

In 1994, WP supplied suspension components to the B194 car by Benetton which propelled Michael Schumacher to his first Formula 1 world championship title.

KTM subsidiary 
From 1997, KTM Power Sports gradually took over the company. Wim Peters remained connected with WP, initially as managing director and later as consultant until his departure in 2004. Beginning in 2009, production was moved to Munderfing, Austria, and suspension components are no longer produced in the former main factory in Malden, Netherlands. In the 2010s, WP expanded their manufacturing portfolio to include frames, exhaust systems, and oil and water coolers for motorcycles and was briefly renamed WP Performance Systems GmbH. As of 2020, the non-suspension activities have been sold off or transferred to other divisions within the parent company, with WP again concentrating solely on the development and manufacture of motorcycle suspension systems.

See also 

Shock absorber
Motorcycle suspension
Motorcycle fork
List of motorcycle suspension manufacturers

References 

Companies of Austria
Motorcycle parts manufacturers
Shock absorber manufacturers
Manufacturing companies of Austria
Automotive motorsports and performance companies
Vehicle manufacturers of Austria
Austrian companies established in 1977
Manufacturing companies established in 1977
Austrian brands

External links
Image of WP coil over suspension units in the Benetton B194 front suspension
Image of WP coil over suspension units in the Benetton B194 rear suspension